Neta may refer to:

People
Neta Alchimister (born 1994), Israeli model
Neta Bahcall (born 1942), American astrophysicist and cosmologist
Neta Dobrin (born 1975), Israeli politician
Neta Doris Neale (1904–1988), New Zealand theatre director
Netta Garti (born 1980), Israeli actress
Neta Harpaz (1893–1970), Israeli politician
Neta Lohnes Frazier (1890–1990), American children's author
Neta Maughan (born 1938), Australian piano teacher
Neta Riskin (born 1976), Israeli actress
Neta Rivkin (born 1991), Israeli rhythmic gymnast
Neta Snook (1896–1991), American aviator
Rui Neta (born 1997), Portuguese footballer

Places
Neta, Cyprus
Neta, Israel
Neta, Nepal (disambiguation)

Organizations
 International Electrical Testing Association (formerly the National Electrical Testing Association)
Ñetas, a Puerto Rican prison gang
 National Educational Telecommunications Association, educational television show distributor usually in cooperation with American Public Television
 New England Translators Association
 New Electricity Trading Arrangements, the UK wholesale electricity market trading arrangements as of 27 March 2001

Other uses
Neta, the ingredient which tops the mound of rice on a piece of nigirizushi
Neta Hebrew (No'ar leTovat ha'Ivrit), literally Youth in Favour of Hebrew, a Hebrew language curriculum for students
 No Electronic Theft Act, a 1997 US law providing criminal penalties for online copyright infringement

Brand
 Neta (car marque), an automotive brand of Hozon Auto.

See also

Netta (disambiguation)